Schodack Island State Park (formerly known as Castleton Island State Park) is a  state park that spans portions of Rensselaer, Greene, and Columbia counties, New York.  The park is located between the Hudson River and Schodack Creek, and was opened in 2002.

History
The name "Schodack" is from the Mahican terms ishoda ("fire plain") and akee ("land"); the name refers to the area being the former home of the Mohicans' central council fire. During the time of the Mahicans, the area now occupied by the park was a group of six islands; it became a continuous peninsula in the early 1900s when a federal project to construct a deep-water navigation channel to Albany necessitated the construction of dikes and the deposition of dredged material along and between the islands.

What was to become Schodack Island State Park was first acquired by the New York State Office of Parks, Recreation and Historic Preservation in the 1970s, and was originally known as Castleton Island State Park. It remained undeveloped until the early 2000s.

Schodack Island State Park was opened in 2002, and was initially a day-use only park. In 2013, plans were proposed to add camping facilities to the park, representing the first new campground constructed by the New York State Office of Parks, Recreation and Historic Preservation in approximately 35 years. The campsites were made available to the public in 2016.

Park facilities
Schodack Island State Park offers a campground with 66 campsites, picnic tables,  of trails, biking, fishing, and hunting. Cross-country skiing and snowshoeing trails are maintained during the winter.

See also
 List of New York state parks

References

External links
 New York State Parks: Schodack Island State Park

State parks of New York (state)
Islands of the Hudson River
Parks on the Hudson River
Parks in Rensselaer County, New York
Parks in Greene County, New York
Parks in Columbia County, New York
River islands of New York (state)
Islands of New York (state)